Uyazytamak (Uyaźıtamaq) is a rural locality (a selo) in Karatovsky Selsoviet, Tuymazinsky District, Bashkortostan, Russia. The population was 593 as of 2010. There are 18 streets.

Geography 
Uyazytamak is located 37 km southwest of Tuymazy (the district's administrative centre) by road. Karatovo is the nearest rural locality.

References 

Rural localities in Tuymazinsky District